Simon Laurens (born 28 November 1967 in Saint Brélade, Jersey) is a British Para-equestrian who competed at the 2008 Summer Paralympics, held in Beijing, China.

Sports career 
He started riding at the age of eight and competed in gymkhana and show jumping with his palomino Champagne, before taking up dressage whilst working with Gemma Green for nine years at her yard in Jersey. Laurens was diagnosed with multiple sclerosis in 2004. Within two years he began competing for the Great Britain para dressage team. He won the National Grade III Disabled Dressage title in 2006 and 2007 and also won both team and individual freestyle golds at the 2007 World Para Championships.

Selected to compete at his first Paralympic Games in 2008, Laurens entered the individual freestyle test grade III and was part of the Great Britain quartet for the overall team championship. Competing on his horse Ocean Diamond he won the silver medal in the individual event behind Hannelore Brenner of Germany. In the team open Laurens, with teammates Lee Pearson, Anne Dunham and Sophie Christiansen won the gold medal. This meant that Great Britain has won a gold medal in that event at four consecutive Games. Following his success in Beijing he was named the BBC South West Disabled Sports Personality of the year for 2008.

In 2009 Laurens won three medals at the European Championships held in Kristiansand, Norway, and was one six people whose efforts were recognised with the award of a medal of honour for "activities connected with international endeavour in relation to equestrian sport". Later that year he was named Disability Sports Personality of the Year at the Gloucestershire Media Sports Awards.

He announced his retirement from international para-equestrian dressage in January 2011, citing "personal and financial reasons" for his decision.

References

Living people
1967 births
Jersey male equestrians
Equestrians at the 2008 Summer Paralympics
Paralympic equestrians of Great Britain
Paralympic gold medalists for Great Britain
Paralympic silver medalists for Great Britain
People from Saint Brélade
Medalists at the 2008 Summer Paralympics
Paralympic medalists in equestrian